Starhill Forest Arboretum (50 acres) is a private arboretum located at 12000 Boy Scout Trail, Petersburg, Illinois.

The arboretum has been owned and operated by the Sternberg family (Edie Sternberg and Guy Sternberg) since 1976. Old trees in the forested areas date to about 1850, and the oldest planted trees were started from seed in 1964 and transplanted from another location.

The arboretum's primary scientific collection is a quercetum (oak collection) comprising one of the most comprehensive living reference collections for the genus in North America. More than 200 other genera of woody plants are also available for study, as well as native forest areas, herb and perennial landscapes, a native prairie garden, several provenance tests, aquatic areas, and conifer plantations. The arboretum contains approximately 2500 accessioned woody taxa and 60 species of spontaneous woody plants.

Permanent records include provenance information, propagation method and year, and mapped location within the arboretum.

In 2008, Starhill Forest became the official arboretum of Illinois College.

See also 
 List of botanical gardens in the United States

External links 
 Starhill Forest Arboretum

Arboreta in Illinois
Botanical gardens in Illinois
Petersburg, Illinois
Protected areas of Menard County, Illinois
Illinois College
1976 establishments in Illinois